The Weibel instability is a plasma instability present in homogeneous or nearly homogeneous electromagnetic plasmas which possess an anisotropy in momentum (velocity) space.  This anisotropy is most generally understood as two temperatures in different directions.  Burton Fried showed that this instability can be understood more simply as the superposition of many counter-streaming beams.  In this sense, it is like the two-stream instability except that the perturbations are electromagnetic and result in filamentation as opposed to electrostatic perturbations which would result in charge bunching. In the linear limit the instability causes exponential growth of electromagnetic fields in the plasma which help restore momentum space isotropy.  In very extreme cases, the Weibel instability is related to one- or two-dimensional stream instabilities.

Consider an electron-ion plasma in which the ions are fixed and the electrons are hotter in the y-direction than in x or z-direction.

To see how magnetic field perturbation would grow, suppose a field B = B cos kx spontaneously arises from noise. The Lorentz force then bends the electron trajectories with the result that upward-moving-ev x B electrons congregate at B and downward-moving ones at A. The resulting current  sheets generate magnetic field that enhances the original field and thus 
perturbation grows.

Weibel instability is also common in astrophysical plasmas, such as collisionless shock formation in supernova remnants and -ray bursts.

A Simple Example of Weibel Instability

As a simple example of Weibel instability, consider an electron beam with density  and initial velocity  propagating in a plasma of density  with velocity . The analysis below will show how an electromagnetic perturbation in the form of a plane wave gives rise to a Weibel instability in this simple anisotropic plasma system. We assume a non-relativistic plasma for simplicity.

We assume there is no background electric or magnetic field i.e. . The perturbation will be taken as an electromagnetic wave propagating along  i.e. . Assume the electric field has the form

From Faraday's Law, we may obtain the perturbation magnetic field

Consider the electron beam. We assume small perturbations, and so linearize the velocity  and density . The goal is to find the perturbation electron beam current density

where second-order terms have been neglected. To do that, we start with the fluid momentum equation for the electron beam

which can be simplified by noting that  and neglecting second-order terms. With the plane wave assumption for the derivatives, the momentum equation becomes

We can decompose the above equations in components, paying attention to the cross product at the far right, and obtain the non-zero components of the beam velocity perturbation:

To find the perturbation density , we use the fluid continuity equation for the electron beam

which can again be simplified by noting that  and neglecting second-order terms. The result is

Using these results, we may use the equation for the beam perturbation current density given above to find

Analogous expressions can be written for the perturbation current density of the left-moving plasma. The net current density perturbation is therefore

The dispersion relation can now be found from Maxwell's Equations:

where  is the speed of light in free space. By defining the effective plasma frequency , the equation above results in

This bi-quadratic equation may be easily solved to give the dispersion relation

Therefore, we must take the dispersion relation/mode corresponding to the minus sign in the equation above.

To gain further insight on the instability, it is useful to harness our non-relativistic assumption  to simplify the square root term, by noting that

The resulting dispersion relation is then much simpler

 is purely imaginary. Writing 

we see that , indeed corresponding to an instability.

The electromagnetic fields then have the form

Therefore, the electric and magnetic fields are  out of phase, and by noting that

so we see this is a primarily magnetic perturbation although there is a non-zero electric perturbation. The magnetic field growth results in the characteristic filamentation structure of Weibel instability. Saturation will happen when the growth rate  is on the order of the electron cyclotron frequency

References 

 Lecture

See also
 Chromo-Weibel Instability

Plasma instabilities
Particle physics